is a quarter of Hamburg, Germany, in the borough of Harburg. It is located in the east of the borough below the Elbe river. In 2020 the population was 1,794.

Geography
Neuland borders the quarters Wilhelmsburg, Gut Moor and Harburg. It also borders the Landkreis Harburg in Lower Saxony.

History
Neuland became a part of Hamburg through the Greater Hamburg Act in 1937.

Politics
These are the results of Gut Moor and Neuland in the Hamburg state election:

Education
The smallest elementary school (Grundschule) in Hamburg is located in Neuland.

References

Quarters of Hamburg
Harburg, Hamburg